Kremnica is a town in central Slovakia. It has around 5,300 inhabitants. The well-preserved medieval town built above important gold mines is the site of the oldest still-working mint in the world.

Name
The name is derived from Slovak kremeň, kremenina (quartz) with a feminine suffix -ica, functioning to create local names.

History 

Kremnica was among the major mining towns of the world during the Middle Ages and in the modern era due to the abundant gold ore deposits in the Kremnica Mountains. However, the first evidence of sub-surface mining activities comes from the 9th century.

In the 13th century the inhabitants of this area were affected by the invasion of the Mongols. Following that difficult period, Hungarian kings invited new colonists from present-day Germany (more specifically Carpathian Germans/Zipser Germans) to settle in the region to help replenish the decimated population. Their innovative technology and knowledge restored the mining activities in the town. The first written reference to the town dates back to 1328, when it was granted royal town privileges by King Charles I of Hungary.

The town's mint was already in existence at the time of the granting of royal privileges. Starting in 1335 the mint produced golden florins and later the famous "Kremnica ducats", which were used as an international means of payment as a result of their consistently high purity of gold. It was the most important mint, and later the only one, in the Kingdom of Hungary, in Czechoslovakia and nowadays in Slovakia; the prosperity brought to the town led to it being given the nickname "Golden Kremnica".

In 1331, Kremnica became the seat of the Chamber Count who was the head of the most important mining and minting chamber of the Kingdom of Hungary. The Count administered all the mines and mints in twelve counties of the kingdom in the Middle Ages.

At the end of the 14th century, Kremnica became the capital of the mining towns in central Upper Hungary. The steady annual production of gold and silver guaranteed the prosperous development of the town. In the 15th century Kreminca was the second most important city in the Kingdom of Hungary. The town was continuously being granted new privileges and the deputies of the town occupied the second place in the Hungarian Diet (the first place was reserved for the representatives of Buda, the capital of the Kingdom).

Gold mining and coin production in Kremnica culminated in the 14th and 15th centuries. As one of the most important centers of Protestant Reformation in the country, the town belonged to the Protestant "League of Seven Mining Towns" together with Banská Belá, Banská Bystrica, Banská Štiavnica, Ľubietová, Nová Baňa, and Pukanec. In the 16th century, the town was a major centre of production of (mostly religious) medals, especially by Joachim Deschler. At the same time however, the miners had to dig deeper and deeper to reach new deposits and the mining conditions deteriorated because of underground water in the shafts. The cost of mining increased and the mining was becoming less profitable. The last gold was extracted in Kremnica in 1970, at which time all the mines were closed. The German population of the town and its surroundings was expelled in 1945 as the consequential punishment by the former Czechoslovak government after World War II.

Geography
It is located in the Kremnica Mountains on the brook Kremnický potok, which is a tributary of the Hron River.

Main sights

The castle built in the 13th through 15th centuries towers over the town. In the first half of the 14th century, it became the residence of the Chamber Count. The town was immediately fortified with a double wall containing several bastions and towers. The castle represents a unique example of a very well preserved fortification system in Central Europe. In the 14th century, it developed into a multifunctional complex of buildings and thus became the centre of local administration, religious life, and defense. At the end of the 15th century, the Chamber Count moved to a newly built house with a unique diamond vault. Thereafter the residence of the Count in the castle was converted into the St. Catherine's Church.

Other sites of interest also include the Museum of Coins and Medals, the Museum of Skiing and a historical main square with a monumental Baroque plague column. The Gothic Church of St. Catherine hosts the popular European Organ Festival. A 20-km long aqueduct, built in the 15th century, is still working, supplying three hydroelectric power plants (one of them located 245 m below the ground). Forested mountains around the town offer plenty of opportunities for hiking and cross-country skiing.

The geographical centre of Europe is claimed to be in the nearby village of Krahule.

Demographics
Kremnica has a population of 5,528 (as of December 31, 2013). According to the 2001 census, 95.8% of inhabitants were Slovaks and 1.2% Germans. However, even among those identifying themselves as Slovaks many are descendants of the Carpathian Germans, who played a very important role in the medieval history of the town. The religious makeup was 64.9% Roman Catholics, 22.6% people with no religious affiliation, and 5.8% Lutherans.

Famous people
Blažej Baláž, Slovak painter
Ján Levoslav Bella, composer, conductor and music teacher
Ľudovít Černák, politician and businessman
Ladislav Chudík, Slovak actor
Igor Kollár, race walker (representing Czechoslovakia and Slovakia)
Peter Michalica, violinist
Jozef Pribilinec, race walker, Olympic gold medalist
Aaron Samuel ben Moses Shalom of Kremnitz, writer

Gallery

Twin towns — sister cities

Kremnica is twinned with:

 Fidenza, Italy
 Herbolzheim, Germany
 Kutná Hora, Czech Republic
 Nový Jičín, Czech Republic
 Šurany, Slovakia
 Várpalota, Hungary

References

 Numismatics

External links

Official municipal website 
Information for tourists
Virtual Kremnica - 3D models, panoramas, photographs and more
Museum of Coins and Medals
Kremnica Castle
Kremnické medovníky, Kremnica 

Cities and towns in Slovakia